Ahmad Al-Dokhi Al-Dossary (born 25 October 1976) is a former Saudi Arabian footballer who last played as a defender for Al-Nassr.

Club career
Al-Dokhi was part of the Al-Hilal team that won the AFC Club Championship and AFC Super Cup in 2000. He then moved on to Al-Ittihad  and helped them lift the AFC Champions League in 2005.

Al-Nassr
On 11 August 2009, Al-Nassr signed Ahmad Al-Dokhi with a one-year contract. On 30 January 2010, Ahmad played his debut against Al-Ahli. On 10 December 2010, he assisted Saad Al-Harthi to make him score against  Najran, they won 6-1. On 29 April 2011, he was sent in the 91 minute against Al-Ettifaq. On 20 May 2011, Ahmad Al-Dokhi scored his first goal for Al-Nassr in his last league match against Al-Ittihad which he lost 2-5. He retired in 2011.

International career
He was a member of the Saudi Arabia national team at the 1998, 2002 and 2006 FIFA World Cups.

Hounors

Al-Hilal
Saudi Professional League (4): 1995-96, 2001-02, 1997-98,  2004-05
Saudi Founder's Cup (1): 1999-2000
Saudi Crown Prince Cup (3): 1999-2000, 2002–03, 2004–05
Saudi-Egyptian Super Cup (1): 2001
Saudi Federation Cup (3): 1995-96, 1999-2000, 2004–05
Gulf Club Champions Cup (1): 1998
Arab Cup Winners' Cup (1): 2000
Arab Super Cup (1): 2001
Asian Club Championship (1): 1999-2000
Asian Cup Winners' Cup (2): 1996-97, 2001-02
Asian Super Cup (2): 1997, 2000

Ittihad
Saudi Professional League (1): 2006-07
AFC Champions League (1): 2005
Arab Champions League (1): 2005

Qatar SC
Qatar Cup (1): 2009

See also
 List of men's footballers with 100 or more international caps

References

External links

1976 births
Living people
Saudi Arabian footballers
Saudi Arabia international footballers
Saudi Arabian expatriate footballers
Ittihad FC players
Al Hilal SFC players
Qatar SC players
Al Nassr FC players
1997 FIFA Confederations Cup players
1998 FIFA World Cup players
2000 AFC Asian Cup players
2002 FIFA World Cup players
2004 AFC Asian Cup players
2006 FIFA World Cup players
Sportspeople from Riyadh
Association football defenders
Saudi Professional League players
Qatar Stars League players
Expatriate footballers in Qatar
Saudi Arabian expatriate sportspeople in Qatar
FIFA Century Club